This is a list of listed buildings in the parish of East Kilbride in South Lanarkshire, Scotland.

List 

|}

Key

Notes

References

 All entries, addresses and coordinates are based on data from Historic Scotland. This data falls under the Open Government Licence

External links

East Kilbride
Buildings and structures in East Kilbride